Crash box may refer to:

 Crash box (vehicle collision), an energy absorbing device installed in order to reduce repair costs in low-speed vehicle collisions
 Crash box (stagecraft), a stagecraft device which reproduces a crash or collision sound effect
 Crash gearbox, non-synchromesh automobile transmission
 Crashbox, an American-Canadian educational children's television series